The General Assembly of New York, commonly known internationally as the New York General Assembly, and domestically simply as General Assembly, was the supreme legislative body of the Province of New York during its period of proprietal colonialship and the legislative body of the Province during its period as a crown colony. It was the representative governing body in New York until April 3, 1775, when the Assembly disbanded after the outbreak of the Revolutionary War.

Background
The New York General Assembly was first convened on October 17, 1683, during the governorship of Thomas Dongan, 2nd Earl of Limerick, which passed an act entitled "A Charter of Liberties" that decreed that the supreme legislative power under the Duke of York (later King James II) shall reside in a governor, council, and the people convened in general assembly; conferred upon the members of the assembly rights and privileges making them a body coequal to and independent of the English Parliament; established town, county, and general courts of justice; solemnly proclaimed the right of religious liberty; and passed acts enunciating certain constitutional liberties, e.g. taxes could be levied only by the people met in general assembly; right of suffrage; and no martial law or quartering of the soldiers without the consent of the inhabitants.

The Assembly grew to twenty-seven members, elected viva voce by the people once every seven years and the districts they represented.  The representatives terms was originally at the will of the governor and new elections were ordered as it suited his interests.  A law was passed that limited member's terms to three years, but it was annulled by King George III.  The Septennial Act was passed in 1743, and remained in force till the revolution.

The General Assembly elected a Speaker from their own ranks, chose their own clerk, and published their own journal.  The Assembly had the sole right of originating all laws granting appropriations of money, and, during Governor William Cosby's administration, which was defined by political struggles and is known as one of the most oppressive royal placeholders, they indeed withheld his compensation in an attempt to bring him closer to their desires.  Reportedly, "these quarrels had considerably subsided before the revolution; but they doubtless had an influence beneficial to liberty, by introducing political discussions, and imparting a knowledge of the tendencies of irresponsible power."

The General Assembly continued until May 1775.  Among its last acts was the adoption of petitions to the King and Parliament of Great Britain, in which, while they "professed a warm attachment to the royal person and government, they solemnly protested against the aggressions that had for years been gaining upon the rights of the people, and expressed, quite as strongly as was then avowed by the patriots of the day, the sentiments advocated in the revolution."

General Assembly

Districts

 Albany County: all of the region that is now northern and western New York.
 Cortlandt Manor
 Dutchess County: now Dutchess and Putnam counties.
 Kings County: the current Kings County; Brooklyn.
 Livingston Manor
 New York County: the current New York County; Manhattan.
 Orange County: now Orange and Rockland counties.
 Queens County: now Queens and Nassau counties.
 Rensselaer Manor
 Richmond County: the current Richmond County; Staten Island.
 Town of Schenectady
 Suffolk County: the current Suffolk County.
 Ulster County: now Ulster and Sullivan counties and part of what is now Delaware and Greene counties.
 Westchester County: now Westchester and Bronx counties.

Representatives
The following were elected as members of the General Assembly.

References
Notes

Sources

Colonial United States (British)
Province of New York
1683 establishments in the Province of New York
Pre-statehood history of New York (state)